Tonev is a Bulgarian masculine surname, its feminine counterpart is Toneva. It may refer to

Aleksandar Tonev (born 1990), Bulgarian football player
Dimo Tonev (born 1964), Bulgarian volleyball player
Irina Toneva (born 1977), Russian singer
Krasimira Toneva
Milen Tonev (born 1988), Bulgarian football player
Nikola Tonev (born 1985), Macedonian football player
Tsvetelin Tonev (born 1992), Bulgarian football player

Bulgarian-language surnames